Hiroshi Sato may refer to:

, Japanese singer-songwriter
, Japanese footballer
, Japanese curler and curling coach